Vovcha is an  long left tributary of the Donets in the Belgorod Oblast of Russia and Kharkiv Oblast in Ukraine.

Its source is in Belgorod Oblast, near the Russian-Ukrainian border, near the village of Volchya Alexandrovka. It flows in a predominantly westerly direction. The confluence with the Donets is near the city of Vovchansk.

References

Rivers of Belgorod Oblast
Rivers of Kharkiv Oblast